There have been two baronetcies created for persons with the surname Backhouse, once in the Baronetage of England and once in the Baronetage of the United Kingdom. As of 2014 one creation is extant.

The Backhouse Baronetcy, of London, was created in the Baronetage of England on 9 November 1660 for William Backhouse, Sheriff of Berkshire from 1664 to 1665. He died without an issue thus his baronetcy became extinct in 1669.

The Backhouse Baronetcy, of Uplands in Darlington in the County of Durham and The Rookery in Middleton Tyas in the North Riding of the County of York, was created in the Baronetage of the United Kingdom on 6 March 1901 for Jonathan Backhouse, a deputy lieutenant and justice of the peace for the North Riding of Yorkshire and County Durham. The Quaker family of Backhouse were prominent linen manufacturers in Darlington. In 1774 Jonathan Backhouse and his younger brother James formed the banking firm of Backhouse & Co which merged with Barclays Bank in 1896. The first Baronet was a great grandson of Jonathan. The third Baronet was the nephew of the second baronet and son of Roger Backhouse. He died on active service in Normandy during the Second World War. As of 2014 the title is held by the latter's grandson, the fifth Baronet, who succeeded his father in 2007.

Backhouse baronets, of London (1660)
 Sir William Backhouse, 1st Baronet (c. 1641–1669)

Backhouse baronets, of Uplands and The Rookery (1901) 
 Sir Jonathan Edmund Backhouse, 1st Baronet (1849–1918)
 Sir Edmund Trelawney Backhouse, 2nd Baronet (1873–1944)
 Sir John Edmund Backhouse, 3rd Baronet (1909–1944)
 Sir Jonathan Roger Backhouse, 4th Baronet (1939–2007)
 Sir Alfred James Stott Backhouse, 5th Baronet (b. 2002)

References

Sources
Kidd, Charles, Williamson, David (editors). Debrett's Peerage and Baronetage (1990 edition). New York: St Martin's Press, 1990, 

Backhouse
Baronetcies in the Baronetage of the United Kingdom